The Charles E. Nelson House was an historic house located in Dufur, Oregon, in the United States. The late 1800s Queen Anne Victorian was burned by the Substation Fire in mid 2018. It was one of the most widely photographed houses in Oregon.

References

External links

 – drone aerial photography (March 27, 2016)

2018 disestablishments in Oregon
Buildings and structures completed in the 19th century
Buildings and structures demolished in 2018
Former buildings and structures in Oregon
Queen Anne architecture in Oregon